Heather Benedict Terrell (born November 24, 1968) is an American novelist and lawyer who writes some of her novels under the pen name Marie Benedict.

Life and education
Terrell attended and graduated from Upper St. Clair High School in Pittsburgh. She then studied History and Art History at Boston College, where she graduated magna cum laude. She then attended and graduated cum laude from Boston University School of Law.

Terrell lives in Pittsburgh with her husband Jim Terrell and their two children.

Career
After graduating from Boston University School of Law, Terrell worked as a litigator for ten years, practicing in New York City at Skadden, Arps, Slate, Meagher & Flom, and Morrison & Foerster.

Terrell published her first novel, The Chrysalis, in 2007, after which she left her work as a litigator and began writing full time. Terrell's "mission is to excavate from the past the most important, complex and fascinating women of history and bring them into the light of present-day where we can finally perceive the breadth of their contributions as well as the insights they bring to modern day issues." Later in her career, Terrell began writing about women who were often overshadowed by the men in their lives, including Mileva Marić (The Other Einstein, 2016), Hedy Lamarr (The Only Woman in the Room, 2019), Clementine Churchill (Lady Clementine, 2020), Belle da Costa Greene (The Personal Librarian, 2021), and Rosalind Franklin (Her Hidden Genius, 2022). Terrell's novels have been translated into twenty-nine languages.

Selected texts

The Only Woman in the Room (2019) 
The Only Woman in the Room, published in 2019 by Sourcebooks Landmark, is a fictionalized biography of Hedy Lamarr. The book is a New York Times and USA Today bestseller and Barnes & Noble Book Club Pick. In 2019, it received a space in Library Reads's Hall of Fame.

Lady Clementine (2020) 
Lady Clementine, published January 7, 2020, by Sourcebooks Landmark, is a fictionalized biography of Clementine Churchill, the wife of Winston Churchill. The book received a starred review from Library Journal and received a space in Library Reads's Hall of Fame.

The Mystery of Mrs. Christie (2020) 
The Mystery of Mrs. Christie, published in 2020 by Sourcebooks Landmark, follows the disappearance of Agatha Christie in December 1926. The book was a New York Times and USA Today bestseller. In December 2020, Library Reads named Terrell a Hall of Fame author for the book.

The Personal Librarian (2021) 

The Personal Librarian, co-authored by Victoria Christopher Murray and published in 2021 by Berkley Books, is a fictionalized biography of Belle da Costa Greene's life as the personal librarian to J. P. Morgan and the first director of the Morgan Library & Museum. 

The Personal Librarian received starred reviews from Booklist and Library Journal, as well as positive reviews from news outlets. Booklist named The Personal Librarian one of the top ten historical fiction novels of 2021. It was also nominated for the Goodreads Choice Award  for Historical Fiction the same year.

Publications

As Marie Benedict
The Other Einstein (2016)
Carnegie's Maid (2018)
The Only Woman in the Room (2019) 
Agent 355 (2020)
Lady Clementine*Agent 355 *The Personal Librarian *Smoke Signal (2020)
The Mystery of Mrs. Christie (2020)
The Personal Librarian, co-authored by Victoria Christopher Murray (2021)
Smoke Signal, co-authored by Kate Quinn (2021)
Her Hidden Genius (2022)

As Heather Terrell

Sources
 Contemporary Authors Online. The Gale Group, 2008. PEN (Permanent Entry Number): 0000177917.
 Bob Hoover (2003). Pittsburgh Post-Gazette: Profile of Heather Terrell. Retrieved November 29, 2008.

References

External links
  Heather Terrell Website
 Marie Benedict website

1968 births
Living people
21st-century American novelists
21st-century American women writers
American mystery writers
American thriller writers
American women novelists
Morrissey College of Arts & Sciences alumni
Boston University School of Law alumni
Skadden, Arps, Slate, Meagher & Flom people
Women mystery writers
Women thriller writers
Writers from Pittsburgh
Novelists from Pennsylvania
21st-century American lawyers
20th-century American lawyers
Lawyers from New York City
20th-century American women
People associated with Morrison & Foerster